Dynamiters or Kimberley Dynamiters may refer to:

The Kimberley Dynamiters may refer to:

Kimberley Dynamiters (WKHL), an ice hockey team that played 1932–1942 in the West Kootenay League and the Alberta-British Columbia Senior League
Kimberley Dynamiters (WIHL), an ice hockey team that played 1946–1981 in the Western International Hockey League
Kimberley Dynamiters (KIJHL), the Canadian 'B' Junior ice hockey team that currently plays in the Kootenay International Junior Hockey League and used to play in the RMJHL and AWHL